Grégoire Burquier (born 7 August 1984) is a French professional tennis player. He competes mainly on the ATP Challenger Tour and ITF Futures, both in singles and doubles. He reached his highest ATP singles ranking of World No. 167 in September 2011, and his highest ATP doubles ranking of World No. 251 in September 2011.

He claimed his first Challenger singles title by winning the 2012 Open Prévadiès Saint–Brieuc in Saint-Brieuc, France. He won against Augustin Gensse 7–5, 6–7, 7–6.

ATP Challenger and ITF Futures finals

Singles: 24 (10–14)

Doubles: 16 (9–7)

Performance timeline

Singles

References

External links

1984 births
Living people
French male tennis players
21st-century French people